Ömer Alp Kulga (born 8 January 1989) is a Belgian professional footballer who plays as a centre-back for TFF Third League club Kuşadasıspor.

Career
Born in Sint-Niklaas, Kulga played in the youth department of Belgian side C.S. Visé, before joining with MVV. He was selected to play with the first team in the summer of 2008, and made his debut on 22 August 2008 in a 3–1 win over Helmond Sport. On 24 March 2011, Kulga was told that he would be released by MVV by the end of the season.

Kulga signed a three-year contract with Turkish Süper Lig club Kayserispor on 4 June 2011.

References

External links
 
 
 Profile at Voetbal International

1989 births
Living people
Sportspeople from Sint-Niklaas
Footballers from East Flanders
Belgian people of Turkish descent
Belgian footballers
Belgian expatriate footballers
MVV Maastricht players
Kayserispor footballers
Orduspor footballers
Mersin İdman Yurdu footballers
Denizlispor footballers
Boluspor footballers
Ankaraspor footballers
Tokatspor footballers
Sakaryaspor footballers
Gümüşhanespor footballers
TFF First League players
TFF Second League players
TFF Third League players
Süper Lig players
Eerste Divisie players
Association football defenders
Expatriate footballers in Turkey
Belgian expatriate sportspeople in Turkey
Belgian expatriate sportspeople in the Netherlands
Expatriate footballers in the Netherlands